GABA transporter 2 (GAT2; SLC6A13) also known as sodium- and chloride-dependent GABA transporter 2 is one of four GABA transporters, GAT1 (SLC6A1), GAT2 (SLC6A13), GAT3 (SLC6A11) and BGT1 (SLC6A12). Note that GAT2 is different from BGT1 despite the fact that the latter transporter is sometimes referred at as (mouse) GAT-2.

All these transporters are highly hydrophobic proteins with 12 transmembrane segments, extracellular glycosylation sites, and intracellular consensus sites for phosphorylation, and there is over 50% amino acid homology between each of them.  Each binds GABA with varying affinities with BGT1 having the lowest affinity and GAT3 the highest. GAT2 (SLC6A13) is predominantly expressed in hepatocytes in the liver, but is also found in proximal tubules in the kidney as well as in the leptomeninges and in some blood vessels in the brain.

Biological function

Brain
Deletion of the GAT2 gene in mice does not appear to have any dramatic effects on brain function in a normal situation. The only difference noted so far is a slight elevation of brain Taurine levels. This was an unexpected finding, but is in agreement with the notion that GAT2 permits efflux of GABA and taurine from the brain to circulating blood through the blood brain barrier. GAT1 and GAT3 have higher concentrations in the brain and have higher affinity to GABA. This makes them more likely than GAT2 to influence the activity of neurotransmitter GABA in the brain.

Liver
GAT2 is expressed in hepatocytes and is well positioned to take up GABA entering the liver from the intestine (via the portal vein), but it is not known if this is an important function. On the other hand, GAT2 is also able to transport taurine and it appears to be the major taurine transporter in the liver.

Kidneys
GAT2 is also present in proximal tubules in the kidney cortex, but only in the basolateral membranes. The physiological function is unknown.

Clinical significance
The clinical significance of GAT2 is at present undetermined.

Some anticonvulsants have been reported to act upon the GABA transporters.  There is evidence to suggest that GABA transporters are linked to epilepsy, affective disorders, and schizophrenia. But considering that GAT1 and GAT3 are expressed at far higher levels in brain tissue, it is likely that inhibition of these transporters will have a far greater anticonvulsant effect than inhibition of GAT2 and BGT1.

References

<Minelli, A; Brecha, NC; Karschin C; Debiasi S; Conti F. (1995) "GAT-1, a High-affinity GABA Plasma Membrane Transporter, Is Localized to Neurons and Astroglia in the Cerebral Cortex." The Journal of Neruoscience. U.S. National Library of Medicine>

Human proteins
Neurotransmitter transporters
Solute carrier family
GABA